Kal-e Chunek (also Romanized as Kal-e Chūnek; also known as Kalchūnek) is a village in Dehdez Rural District, Dehdez District, Izeh County, Khuzestan Province, Iran. At the 2006 census, its population was 26, in 6 families.

References 

Populated places in Izeh County